20,000 Cheers for the Chain Gang is an extant musical comedy film released in 1933. It was directed by Roy Mack. The 20-minute film is about escaped prisoners trying to break back into a jail where condition have improved dramatically. The film was written by A. Dorian Otvos and Cyrus Wood. It is a spoof of the 1932 film I Am a Fugitive from a Chain Gang. and 20,000 Years in Sing Sing. It is a Vitaphone film.

Cast
Patti Pickens
Jerry Bergen
Jane Pickens
Helen Pickens
Charles Herbert (actor)
James Baskett, uncredited

References

1933 comedy films
Films about prison escapes
American parody films